Globe Woolen Company Mills is a historic woolen mill complex and national historic district located at Utica, Oneida County, New York.  It encompasses four contributing components of an intact mill complex: the Woolen Mill Grouping (1872-1873); Storehouse #2 (1872-1873); Storehouse #3 (1872-1873); and the Worsted Mill Grouping (1886). They include four-story mill buildings, attached company office, and two remaining store houses.  The buildings are constructed of red brick and have Italianate style design elements.  After the mill closed in the 1950s, the buildings were reused for college classrooms and later as offices.

It was added to the National Register of Historic Places in 2016.

References

Textile mills in New York (state)
Historic districts on the National Register of Historic Places in New York (state)
Industrial buildings and structures on the National Register of Historic Places in New York (state)
Industrial buildings completed in 1873
Italianate architecture in New York (state)
Buildings and structures in Oneida County, New York
National Register of Historic Places in Oneida County, New York
1873 establishments in New York (state)